Mabel Mosquera Mena (born July 1, 1969) is a weightlifter from Quibdó, Colombia.

Born in Quibdó, Department of Chocó, she started weightlifting in 1999.

She competed in the women's 53 kg weight class at the 2004 Summer Olympics. Lifting 197.5 kg in total, she won the bronze medal in Athens, Greece.

Notes and references

External links

1969 births
Living people
People from Quibdó
Olympic weightlifters of Colombia
Weightlifters at the 2003 Pan American Games
Weightlifters at the 2004 Summer Olympics
Olympic bronze medalists for Colombia
Olympic medalists in weightlifting
Colombian female weightlifters
Medalists at the 2004 Summer Olympics
Pan American Games gold medalists for Colombia
Pan American Games medalists in weightlifting
Medalists at the 2003 Pan American Games
Sportspeople from Chocó Department
20th-century Colombian women
21st-century Colombian women